Willem Frederik "Wim" van Eer (19 December 1927 – 2 July 2011) was a Surinamese diplomat and educator. He served as Minister Plenipotentiary of Suriname from 1 April 1974 until the Independence of Suriname on 25 November 1975. Subsequently, he was appointed first Ambassador of Suriname to the Netherlands and served until 20 May 1980.

Biography
Van Eer was born on 19 December 1927 in Paramaribo. He studied pedagogy at the Nuts Academy in Rotterdam, and subsequently at the University of Utrecht. Van Eer was one of the founders of the Surinamese in Rotterdam Foundation. In 1964, he returned to Suriname and became the principal of the kweekschool (normal school) in Paramaribo. He became a member of the National Party of Suriname.

Henck Arron appointed van Eer as Minister Plenipotentiary of Suriname on 1 April 1974. He played an important role in the negotiations for Independence of Suriname. On 25 November 1975, his function became obsolete, and he was appointed as first Ambassador of Suriname to the Netherlands.

On 25 February 1980, Desi Bouterse committed a coup d'état On 11 March, van Eer returned to Suriname to negotiate with the new regime. He was honourably discharged effective 20 May 1980, and reassigned to the Ministry of Foreign Affairs. On 24 December, Hans Prade was appointed as his successor.

Van Eer died on 2 July 2011 in Paramaribo, at the age of 83.

Honours
 Commander of the Honorary Order of the Palm.

References

1927 births
2011 deaths
People from Paramaribo
Ambassadors of Suriname to the Netherlands
Government ministers of Suriname
Surinamese educators
Utrecht University alumni
Ministers plenipotentiary (Suriname)